FC Ingolstadt 04 is a German football club based in Ingolstadt, Bavaria. The following is a list of each season completed by the club, inclusive of all major competitions.

Key
Key to competitions

 Bundesliga (1. BL) – The top-flight of football in Germany, established in 1963.
 2. Bundesliga (2. BL) – The second division of football in Germany, established in 1974.
 3. Liga (3. L) – The third division of football in Germany, established in 2008.
 Regionalliga (RL) – The fourth division of football in Germany, established in 1964 and designated as the fourth tier in 2008.
 Bayernliga (OLB) – A fifth division of football in Germany, established in 1991.
 DFB-Pokal (DFBP) – The premier knockout cup competition in German football, first contested in 1935.
 UEFA Champions League (UCL) – The premier competition in European football since 1955. It went by the name of European Cup until 1992.
 UEFA Europa League (UEL) – The second-tier competition in European football since 1971. It went by the name of UEFA Cup until 2009.

Key to colors and symbols

Key to league record
 Season = The year and article of the season
 Div = Division/level on pyramid
 League = League name
 Pld = Games played
 W = Games won
 D = Games drawn
 L = Games lost
 GF = Goals for
 GA = Goals against
 GD = Goal difference
 Pts = Points
 Pos. = League position

Key to cup record
 DNE = Did not enter
 DNQ = Did not qualify
 NH = Competition not held or canceled
 QR = Qualifying round
 PR = Preliminary round
 GS = Group stage
 R1 = First round
 R2 = Second round
 R3 = Third round
 R4 = Fourth round
 R5 = Fifth round
 Ro16 = Round of 16
 QF = Quarter-finals
 SF = Semi-finals
 F = Final
 RU = Runners-up
 W = Winners

Seasons

References 
 FC Ingolstadt 04 at worldfootball.net
 FC Ingolstadt 04 at Fußballdaten.de (in German)

Seasons
FC Ingolstadt 04
German football club statistics